The official German airplay chart ranks the most frequently broadcast songs on German radio stations. In 2018, 19 different songs reached the top, based on weekly airplay data compiled by MusicTrace on behalf of Bundesverband Musikindustrie (BVMI). The radio stations are chosen based on the reach of each station. A specific number of evaluated stations is not given.

Felix Jaehn's collaboration "Like a Riddle" with Hearts and Colours & Adam Trigger was the first number one of the year. It was replaced the following week by P!nk's "Beautiful Trauma". Lost Frequencies' & Zonderling's "Crazy" dethroned P!nk after her two-week reign and topped the chart for the following five weeks. "Flames", released in March, by French DJ David Guetta and Australian singer Sia reached the top on 11 May. After eight consecutive weeks atop, it was replaced by Calvin Harris' and Dua Lipa's "One Kiss" on 29 June, which was the second best-performing song of the year and was played more than 48,000 times within 2018. Namika's "Je ne parle pas français (Beatgees Remix)", featuring Black M, was the only German and French song atop the chart in 2018 and was played 35,000 times on evaluated stations. Nico Santos' "Safe" and Alle Farben, Kelvin Jones & Younotus "Only Thing We Know" topped the chart for four weeks each in the summer.

Calvin Harris' song "Promises", alongside English singer Sam Smith, was his second song to top the chart and the second to hold the position for eight consecutive weeks in 2018. The final number one of 2018 was "Sweet but Psycho" by American singer Ava Max which topped the chart for the last three weeks of the year. The best-performing single of the year was "Flames" by David Guetta and Sia.

Chart history

References

Germany airplay
Airplay 2018